Tağılı (also, Tagily and Tagyay) is a village and municipality in the Hajigabul Rayon of Azerbaijan.  It has a population of 332.

References 

Populated places in Hajigabul District